The Return of the Living Dead  is the original soundtrack from the film of the same name, released in 1985 by Enigma Records. The film itself is a horror comedy film written and directed by Dan O'Bannon about a group of teenage punks dealing with a horde of brain-hungry zombies.

The soundtrack features classic punk rock, horror punk/death rock, psychobilly songs by groups like the Cramps, 45 Grave, T.S.O.L., the Damned and the Flesh Eaters.

The soundtrack has undergone numerous releases in different countries.

A limited vinyl edition was released in 2016.

Track listing

Other musical credits 

 Francis Haines, "The Trioxin Theme" (Main title)
 The F.U.'s, "Young, Fast Iranians" : 1991 Hemdale version and subsequent DVD and Blu-ray Releases, though not on official soundtrack album.
 45 Grave, "Partytime (Single Version)": version actually used in the film, though not on official soundtrack album.
 Norbert Schultze, "Panzer Rollen in Afrika vor": song playing on Ernie's walkman, though not on official soundtrack album.

Personnel 

 Cover (Album Cover Design) – Brian Ayuso;
 Mastered By – Eddy Schreyer;
 Producer (Executive Soundtrack Album Production) – Budd Carr;
 Producer (Soundtrack Album Production) – Steve Pross, William Hein;

Releases 
 The Return Of The Living Dead (Original Motion Picture Soundtrack), (LP, Album), Enigma Records, US 1985. 	
 Le Retour Des Morts Vivants "The Return Of The Living Dead", (LP, Pic, Comp), New Rose Records, France 1985.
 Le Retour Des Morts Vivants (The Return Of The Living Dead), (LP, Comp), New Rose Records, France, 1985. 	
 The Return Of The Living Dead OST, (Cass, Album), Big Beat Records, UK, 1985. 	
 The Return Of The Living Dead (Original Motion Picture Soundtrack), (CD, Album), Big Beat Records, UK, 1985. 	
 The Return Of The Living Dead (Original Motion Picture Soundtrack), (CD, Album, Comp), Metal Blade Records, Restless Records, US, 1985. 	
 The Return Of The Living Dead (Original Motion Picture Soundtrack), (Cass, Album) Enigma Records US 1985. 	
 The Return Of The Living Dead (Original Motion Picture Soundtrack), (Cass, Album, Comp) Enigma Records New Zealand 1985. 	
 The Return Of The Living Dead (Original Motion Picture Soundtrack), (LP, Album) Big Beat Records 1985. 	
 The Return Of The Living Dead (Original Motion Picture Soundtrack), (LP, Album), Enigma Records, Big Time, New Zealand, 1985. 	
 The Return Of The Living Dead (Original Motion Picture Soundtrack), (LP, Comp), Big Beat Records, UK, 1985. 	
 The Return Of The Living Dead (Original Motion Picture Soundtrack), (LP, Comp, W/Lbl), Big Beat Records, UK, 1985. 	
 The Return Of The Living Dead (Original Motion Picture Soundtrack), (LP, Ltd, Pic), Enigma Records, US, 1985. 	
 The Return Of The Living Dead (Original Soundtrack), (LP, Album) Enigma Records 2004, Netherlands, 1985. 	
 Various – Le Retour Des Morts Vivants (The Return Of The Living Dead), (LP, Comp, TP), New Rose Records, France, 1985. 	
 Battalion / The Return Of The Living Dead - Original Soundtrack, (LP, Album), Victor, Japan 1986. 	
 The Return Of The Living Dead (Original Motion Picture Soundtrack), (LP, Album), Enigma Records, Spain, 1986. 	
 Battalion / The Return Of The Living Dead - Original Soundtrack, (CD, Album, RM), Victor, Japan, 1987.	
 The Return Of The Living Dead (Original Motion Picture Soundtrack), (CD), Enigma Records, US, 1987. 
 The Return Of The Living Dead (Original Soundtrack), (LP, Album, Ltd, RE, Bla), Real Gone Music, 2016.

 The making of the soundtrack - Blu-ray bonus features (2016) 
Blu-ray review: The Return of the Living Dead: Collector’s Edition''
 "Party Time: The Music of The Return Of The Living Dead" (Expanded Version) (30 minutes), with Music Consultants Budd Carr, Steve Pross and Soundtrack Artists: Dinah Cancer (45 Grave), Chris D (The Flesh Eaters), Roky Erickson, Karl Moet (SSQ), Joe Wood (T.S.O.L.), Mark Robertson (Tall Boys). Also featuring musicians: Greg Hetson (Circle Jerks) and John Sox (The F.U.'s, Straw Dogs) — As mentioned, the soundtrack for the film is a loving ode to 1980s punk rock, and some of its stalwarts look back at the process of getting on the soundtrack.

References

See also 
 Night of the Living Dead (film series)

1985 soundtrack albums
Comedy film soundtracks
Return of the Living Dead (film series)
Horror punk compilation albums
Psychobilly
Horror film soundtracks